Bollklubben Häcken Fotbollsförening are a women's football club based in Gothenburg, Sweden. Founded in 1970 as Landvetters IF and known as Kopparbergs/Göteborg FC between 2004 and 2020, the club became the women's section of the men's club BK Häcken in 2021, although as a separate club which is a subsidiary of BK Häcken for legal reasons.

BK Häcken FF play their home games at Bravida Arena in Gothenburg. The team colors are yellow and black. The club won their first Damallsvenskan title in 2020.

History
BK Häcken was established in 1970 as Landvetters IF in Landvetter, a town near Gothenburg. In 2004, the club moved into Gothenburg city and changed its name to Kopparbergs/Göteborg FC accordingly.

Veteran Bo Falk was the club's head coach from 1999 until 2004. From 2005 until 2007, the coach was Martin Pringle. He was replaced by Torbjörn Nilsson for the 2008 season.

In the 2010 Damallsvenskan season, Kopparbergs/Göteborg FC finished as runners-up and qualified for the 2011–12 UEFA Women's Champions League for the first time. In 2011, they won the Swedish Cup on a penalty shootout over Tyresö, before retaining the trophy in 2012 by beating Tyresö in the final again.

Kopparbergs/Göteborg FC won their first league title in 2020. On 29 December 2020, the club board announced that its intention to cease operating the first team in the Damallsvenskan. Two days later, it reversed the decision to continue in 2021. However, on January 28 the club became the women's department of BK Häcken, a men's football club also based in Gothenburg and playing in top tier.

Current squad

Out on loan

Former players

Honours

Damallsvenskan (1): 2020
Svenska Cupen (3): 2011, 2012, 2019
Svenska Supercupen (1): 2013

Record in UEFA Women's Champions League
All results (away, home and aggregate) list Kopparbergs/Göteborg's goal tally first.

a First leg.

References

External links

 
 Former website – Kopparbergs/Göteborg FC

 
Women's football clubs in Sweden
Football clubs in Gothenburg
1970 establishments in Sweden
Damallsvenskan teams
Association football clubs established in 1970
Football clubs in Västra Götaland County